Yanina Wickmayer was the defending champion, but lost in the first round to Viktorija Golubic.

Christina McHale won her first WTA title, defeating Kateřina Siniaková in the final, 3–6, 6–4, 6–4.

Seeds

Draw

Finals

Top half

Bottom half

Qualifying

Seeds

Qualifiers

Lucky losers
 Antonia Lottner

Qualifying draw

First qualifier

Second qualifier

Third qualifier

Fourth qualifier

References
Main Draw
Qualifying Draw

Japan Women's Open
2016 Japan Women's Open